Gerard Bromley Robert Christian (19 February 1870 - c. June 1919) served as Magistrate of the British Overseas Territory of Pitcairn Island from 1910 to 1919. As is commonly the case with the small population of Pitcairn, he was closely related to several other island leaders, notably cousins Edgar Allen Christian, Frederick Martin Christian, and Charles Richard Parkin Christian. He was also the grandson of Thursday October Christian II and was the father of John Lorenzo Christian. He was born and died on Pitcairn Island.

Ancestry

References

1870 births
1919 deaths
Pitcairn Islands people of Polynesian descent
Pitcairn Islands politicians
Pitcairn Islands people of English descent
Pitcairn Islands people of Manx descent
Pitcairn Islands people of Saint Kitts and Nevis descent
Pitcairn Islands people of Scottish descent
Pitcairn Islands people of Cornish descent